Martin Haverty (1809–1887) was an Irish journalist and historian.

Life
Born in County Mayo on 1 December 1809, he received most of his education at the Irish College, Paris. He came to Dublin in 1836. In the following year he joined the staff of the Freeman's Journal, with which he was connected until 1850.

In 1851 Haverty made an extended tour through Europe, which he described in a long series of newspaper contributions. On his return to Dublin Haverty was made sub-librarian at the King's Inns, where he remained for nearly a quarter of a century, devoting himself principally to the preparation of a general index to the books in the library. He died in Dublin on 18 January 1887 and was buried in Glasnevin Cemetery. Joseph Patrick Haverty was his brother.

Works
Haverty wrote:
 ‘Wanderings in Spain in 1843,’ London, 2 vols., 1844. 
 ‘The History of Ireland, Ancient and Modern. Derived from our native annals … with copious Topographical and general Notes,’ Dublin, 1860. The materials for this history were largely gathered abroad. A second and enlarged edition appeared in 1885. 
 ‘The History of Ireland, Ancient and Modern, for the use of Schools and Colleges,’ &c., Dublin, 1860.

References

Attribution

External links
 Biographical notes and images @ Cappagh

1809 births
1887 deaths
19th-century Irish people
People from County Mayo
People from County Galway
Irish writers
19th-century travel writers
Irish travel writers
Irish journalists
19th-century Irish historians
Freeman's Journal people
19th-century journalists
Male journalists
19th-century male writers
19th-century Irish businesspeople